Ulrike Richter (later Schmidt, born 17 June 1959) is a German former swimmer who competed for East Germany in the 1970s. At the 1976 Olympic Games in Montreal she won three gold medals. She received two gold medals at the 1973 World Aquatics Championships, and two in 1975. Richter set 14 world records during her career, in 100 m backstroke, 200 m backstroke, and medley relay. She was inducted into the International Swimming Hall of Fame in Fort Lauderdale, Florida in 1983.

Doping
Officials from the East German team have confessed that they administered performance-enhancing drugs to Richter during her career.

See also
 List of members of the International Swimming Hall of Fame

References

External links
 

1959 births
Living people
People from Görlitz
German female swimmers
Olympic swimmers of East Germany
Swimmers at the 1976 Summer Olympics
Olympic gold medalists for East Germany
Doping cases in swimming
German sportspeople in doping cases
World record setters in swimming
Female backstroke swimmers
World Aquatics Championships medalists in swimming
European Aquatics Championships medalists in swimming
Medalists at the 1976 Summer Olympics
Olympic gold medalists in swimming
Sportspeople from Saxony